Gandabeh, Khorramabad  may refer to:

Gandabeh, Azna
Gandabeh, Robat